Satiety value is the degree at which food gives a human the sense of food gratification, the exact contrast feeling of hunger. The concept of the Satiety Value and Satiety Index was developed by Australian researcher and doctor, Susanna Holt. Highest satiety value is expected when the food that remains in the stomach for a longer period produces greatest functional activity of the organ. Limiting the food intake after reaching the satiety value helps reduce obesity problems.

Foods with the most satiation per calorie are often:
 high in certain proteinase inhibitors that suppress appetite - eg potatoes
 high in protein (which takes longer to digest than other energy sources) - eg meat
 low in glycemic index (in which the carbohydrates take longer to digest) - eg oats
 high in fibre (which takes longer to digest than low fibre foods) - eg fruit
 low in calories - eg vegetables
 solid (which takes longer to digest than liquid foods, though liquids have high satiety for a short period)

Foods with great satiety value (by how much more satiating they are than white bread) include:
 Boiled potatoes 3x 
 Ling fish 2x
 Porridge/oatmeal 2x
 Oranges 2x
 Apples 2x
 Brown pasta 2x
 Beef 2x
The Protein leverage hypothesis posits that human beings will prioritize the consumption of protein in food over other dietary components, and will eat until protein needs have been met, regardless of energy content, thus leading of over-consumption of foodstuffs when their protein content is low.

Further factors involved in determining the satiety of foods are covered in the expected satiety entry.

See also
Expected satiety values for foods
Protein leverage hypothesis
Polyphagia

References

Further reading
 
 

 

Hunger
Eating behaviors of humans